Kotgarh Wildlife Sanctuary is situated in the Baliguda subdivision of Kandhamal district of Odisha state in India. It is classified as an Eastern Highlands moist deciduous forest. Around 52 tribal villages such as Kutia Kondh and Desia Kondh inhabit the sanctuary.

About
Designated and proposed reserve forests include Madagoda , Haripur , Lassery, Bonduru, Supamaha, Killangi, Subarnagiri  and Guma. Kotgarh sanctuary spreads over Kotgarh jurisdiction, Tumudibandha range and Daringbadi block in Kandhamal district.

Kotgarh is nominated to be a part of the proposed 14 elephant corridors for safe movement of the elephants which frequently come out of their habitation in search of food and water.

Flora
The main vegetation of the sanctuary consists of dense moist deciduous forests with grasslands.  The floral diversity of the sanctuary consists of 650 plant species that include angiosperms, pteridophytes, gymnosperms, bryophytes, lichens and fungi. The dominant flora includes Sal, Piasal, Sisoo, Kendu, Gamhar, Asan, Kusum, Harida, Bahada, Amala, Mango, Tamarind, Mahua, Jackfruit, Randhan, Kangada, Jamun, Salapo, Bheru, Arjun, Char, Dhaura and Kochila.

There are many rare and endangered medicinal plants including Abutilon indicum, Cissus quadrangularis, Crateva magna, Cycas sphaerica, Garcinia xanthochymus, Gardenia gummifera, Gloriosa superba, Justicia adhatoda, Litsea glutinosa, Oroxylum indicum, Pueraria tuberosa, Rauvolfia tetraphylla, Saraca asoca, Steriospermum suaveolens, Symplocos racemosa, Tinospora cordifolia and Zanthoxylum armatum| Zanthoxylum rhetsa.

Fauna
Animal species present in this sanctuary include Tiger, elephant, Gaur, Sambar deer, Spotted deer, Peafowl, Red jungle fowl, Black buck, Leopard, Sloth bear, Chital, other bird species and reptiles including rare species such as Boiga forsteni. Chousingha (Tetracerus quadricornis) or four-horned antelope are the main attraction in the sanctuary.

Attractions
A wooden bungalow at Belghar attracts many nature loving visitors.

How to reach 
By Road : Baliguda is connected with Berhampur and other cities of Orissa via NH-59.

By Rail : Nearest Rail Head is at Berhampur on S.E. Railway 180 km from Muniguda.

By Air : Nearest Air Port is at Bhubaneswar which is 291 km from Balliguda

See also
. MAA Bhavani Mata upasana pitha .kesariguda,kotagarh,kandhamal

Wildlife sanctuaries of India
Baliguda (Odisha Vidhan Sabha constituency)

References 

Wildlife sanctuaries in Odisha
Chota Nagpur dry deciduous forests
1981 establishments in Orissa
Protected areas established in 1981